Morro Strand State Beach  (formerly Atascadero State Beach) is a protected beach within California's state park system located in north Morro Bay  along California State Route 1.  Morro Strand is a popular  coastal frontage park on Estero Bay featuring  the Morro Strand Trail  and picnic sites. A three-mile stretch of beach connects the southern and northern entrances to the beach. Dogs are prohibited in part due to the nesting and protection of the Western Snowy Plover. Fishing, surfing, beach walking, and jogging are popular activities.

Proposed for closure
Morro Strands State Beach was one of the 48 California state parks proposed for closure in January 2008 by California's Governor Arnold Schwarzenegger as part of a deficit reduction program.

Marine Protected Areas
Morro Bay State Marine Recreational Management Area and Morro Bay State Marine Reserve are marine protected areas within Morro Bay.  Like underwater parks, these marine protected areas help conserve ocean wildlife and marine ecosystems.

See also
Morro Rock
List of beaches in California
List of California state parks

References

External links
California State Parks: official Morro Strand State Beach website

California State Beaches
Morro Bay
Parks in San Luis Obispo County, California
Beaches of Southern California
Beaches of San Luis Obispo County, California